Khara Rud Rural District is a rural district (dehestan) in the Central District of Siahkal County, Gilan Province, Iran. At the 2006 census, its population was 7,899, in 2,054 families. The rural district has 34 villages.

References 

Rural Districts of Gilan Province
Siahkal County